The Convention concerning the Rights of Association and Combination of Agricultural Workers is an International Labour Organization Convention adopted in 1921. The convention secures the rights of "association and combination" of agricultural workers to the same extent as those rights are extended to industrial workers.

Ratifications 
As of January 2023, 123 states have ratified the convention.

External links 
Text
Ratifications

Right
Treaties concluded in 1921
Treaties entered into force in 1923
Agricultural labor
Agricultural treaties
Freedom of association
Treaties of the People's Socialist Republic of Albania
Treaties of Algeria
Treaties of Antigua and Barbuda
Treaties of Argentina
Treaties of Australia
Treaties of the First Austrian Republic
Treaties of Azerbaijan
Treaties of the Bahamas
Treaties of Bangladesh
Treaties of Barbados
Treaties of the Byelorussian Soviet Socialist Republic
Treaties of Belgium
Treaties of Belize
Treaties of the Republic of Dahomey
Treaties of Bosnia and Herzegovina
Treaties of the Second Brazilian Republic
Treaties of the Kingdom of Bulgaria
Treaties of Burkina Faso
Treaties of Myanmar
Treaties of Burundi
Treaties of Cameroon
Treaties of the Central African Republic
Treaties of Chad
Treaties of Chile
Treaties of the Republic of China (1912–1949)
Treaties of Colombia
Treaties of the Comoros
Treaties of the Republic of the Congo (Léopoldville)
Treaties of the Republic of the Congo
Treaties of the Cook Islands
Treaties of Costa Rica
Treaties of Ivory Coast
Treaties of Croatia
Treaties of Cuba
Treaties of Cyprus
Treaties of the Czech Republic
Treaties of Czechoslovakia
Treaties of Denmark
Treaties of Djibouti
Treaties of Dominica
Treaties of Ecuador
Treaties of the Republic of Egypt (1953–1958)
Treaties of Estonia
Treaties of the Ethiopian Empire
Treaties of Fiji
Treaties of Finland
Treaties of the French Third Republic
Treaties of Gabon
Treaties of the Weimar Republic
Treaties of Ghana
Treaties of the Kingdom of Greece
Treaties of Grenada
Treaties of Guatemala
Treaties of Guinea
Treaties of Iceland
Treaties of British India
Treaties of Ba'athist Iraq
Treaties of the Irish Free State
Treaties of the Kingdom of Italy (1861–1946)
Treaties of Jamaica
Treaties of Kenya
Treaties of Kyrgyzstan
Treaties of Latvia
Treaties of Lesotho
Treaties of Lithuania
Treaties of Luxembourg
Treaties of North Macedonia
Treaties of Madagascar
Treaties of Malawi
Treaties of Mali
Treaties of Malta
Treaties of Mauritania
Treaties of Mauritius
Treaties of Mexico
Treaties of Moldova
Treaties of Montenegro
Treaties of Morocco
Treaties of Mozambique
Treaties of the Netherlands
Treaties of New Zealand
Treaties of Nicaragua
Treaties of Niger
Treaties of Nigeria
Treaties of Norway
Treaties of the Dominion of Pakistan
Treaties of Panama
Treaties of Papua New Guinea
Treaties of Paraguay
Treaties of Peru
Treaties of the Second Polish Republic
Treaties of Portugal
Treaties of the Kingdom of Romania
Treaties of Rwanda
Treaties of Saint Lucia
Treaties of Saint Vincent and the Grenadines
Treaties of Senegal
Treaties of Serbia and Montenegro
Treaties of Seychelles
Treaties of Singapore
Treaties of Slovakia
Treaties of Slovenia
Treaties of the Solomon Islands
Treaties of the Soviet Union
Treaties of the Second Spanish Republic
Treaties of the Dominion of Ceylon
Treaties of Suriname
Treaties of Eswatini
Treaties of Sweden
Treaties of Switzerland
Treaties of the United Arab Republic
Treaties of Tajikistan
Treaties of Tanganyika
Treaties of Togo
Treaties of Tunisia
Treaties of Turkey
Treaties of Uganda
Treaties of the Ukrainian Soviet Socialist Republic
Treaties of the United Kingdom
Treaties of Uruguay
Treaties of Venezuela
Treaties of Yugoslavia
Treaties of Zambia
Treaties of the Federation of Malaya
Treaties of Malaysia
Treaties extended to Greenland
1921 in labor relations